Annamitella Mansuy 1916 is a genus of trilobite, extinct marine arthropods. Annamitella lived from the Arenig to the Llandeilo age of the Ordovician Period from 478.6 to 460.9 million years ago.

Distribution 
The genus has been reported from:
 Molles, San Juan and Suri Formations, Argentina
 Nora Formation, Australia
 Dawan, Honghuayuan, Laozai, Xiaqiaojia, Duoquanshan, Yingou, Yehli and Shihtzupu Formations, China
 Alakul and Uzunbulak Formations, Kazakhstan

References 

Leiostegiina
Corynexochida genera
Ordovician trilobites of Australia
Ordovician trilobites of Asia
Fossils of China
Fossils of Kazakhstan
Ordovician trilobites of South America
Ordovician Argentina
Fossils of Argentina
Fossil taxa described in 1916